The Miss Ecuador 1992 was held on April 15, 1992. There were 12 candidates for the national title. In the end of the night Diana Neira from Guayas crowned Soledad Diab, also from Guayas, as Miss Ecuador 1992. The Miss Ecuador competed at Miss Universe 1992.

Results

Placements

Special awards

Contestants

Casting

A casting was held in 1992 to select an Ecuadorian representative to compete at Miss World 1992.

Notes

Returns

Last compete in:

1980
 Imbabura
1987
 Tungurahua
1989
 El Oro
 Esmeraldas

Withdraws

 Los Ríos

External links

Miss Ecuador
1992 beauty pageants
Beauty pageants in Ecuador
1992 in Ecuador